Overflow is a free, print magazine covering the arts and pop culture of the neighborhoods surrounding the Gowanus Canal in South Brooklyn, New York. Specifically, the magazine covers stories related to "Park Slope, Gowanus, Cobble Hill, Carroll Gardens, Red Hook, and Boerum Hill."

The quarterly magazine launched in 2008.

References

Visual arts magazines published in the United States
Quarterly magazines published in the United States
Free magazines
Local interest magazines published in the United States
Magazines established in 2008
Magazines published in New York City